Thomas L. James is a United States Army major general who serves as the acting commander of Combined Joint Task Force–Space Operations. He previously served as the first commander of Joint Task Force–Space Defense from 2019 to 2022. He is the first Army space operations officer to reach the rank of major general.

Military career 
James first enlisted in the Mississippi National Guard in 1983, where he was assigned in medical and special forces units. After obtaining a degree, he was commissioned into the United States Army in 1990 as an army aviator.

On July 15, 2014, James took command of the 1st Space Brigade. After this command tour, he was assigned as the director of space policy implementation of Office of the Under Secretary for Policy.

James served as deputy commander of the Joint Functional Component Command for Space. While in this position, he was promoted to brigadier general on November 14, 2017. After a 2017 reorganization, he then served as the director of operations, plans, and exercises of the Joint Force Space Component Command.

With the creation of the United States Space Command in August 2019, James became the director of operations while dual-hatted as the first commander of the newly-established Joint Task Force–Space Defense (JTF-SD). After almost two years, he was nominated for promotion to major general. In 2021, he released his vision for the unit.  He got promoted on July 29, 2021, making him the first Army space operations officer to achieve the rank of major general.

James relinquished command of JTF-SD on November 4, 2022. He thereafter was assigned as deputy commander of Combined Joint Task Force-Space Operations, a planned subordinate command of U.S. Space Command.

Dates of promotion

References

Living people
Recipients of the Legion of Merit
United States Army generals
United States Army personnel of the Gulf War
United States Army personnel of the Iraq War
United States Army personnel of the War in Afghanistan (2001–2021)
Year of birth missing (living people)